Borsky District is the name of several administrative and municipal districts in Russia.

Modern districts
Borsky District, Samara Oblast, an administrative and municipal district of Samara Oblast

Historical districts
Borsky District, Nizhny Novgorod Oblast, a former administrative and municipal district of Nizhny Novgorod Oblast; in terms of the administrative units transformed into a city of oblast significance, and in terms of the municipal units transformed into an urban okrug in March 2010

References